This is a list of airlines of Azerbaijan which have an Air Operator Certificate issued by the Civil Aviation Authority .

Scheduled airlines

Charter airlines

Cargo airlines

See also 

 List of airports in Azerbaijan
List of defunct airlines of Azerbaijan
 List of airlines
 List of defunct airlines of Europe

References

External links 

Airlines
Azerbaijan
Airlines
Azerbaijan
Azerbaijan